2017–18 Syed Mushtaq Ali Trophy was the tenth edition of Syed Mushtaq Ali Trophy competition, an Indian domestic team only Twenty20 cricket tournament in India. It was held from 21 to 26 January 2018.

Group stage

West Zone

Central Zone

South Zone

East Zone

North Zone

Super League

Group A

Points table

Fixtures

Group B

Points table

Fixtures

Final

References

External links
 Series at ESPN Cricinfo
 Series at bcci

2018 in Indian cricket
Domestic cricket competitions in 2017–18